Pentagonite is a rare silicate mineral  with formula Ca(VO)Si4O10·4(H2O).
It was named for the unusual twinning which produces an apparent five-fold symmetry. It is a dimorph of cavansite.

Pentagonite was first described in 1973 for an occurrence in Lake Owyhee State Park, Malheur County, Oregon. It has also been reported from the Pune district of India. It occurs as fracture and cavity fillings in tuff and basalt. It occurs with cavansite, heulandite, stilbite, analcime, apophyllite and calcite.

References

Phyllosilicates
Orthorhombic minerals
Minerals in space group 36
Vanadium minerals